Areej Chaudhary (born 7 May 1997) is a Pakistani model and drama actress. She is the winner of Miss Pakistan World 2020 and was sent to Miss Earth 2020 virtually to represent Pakistan, she is also a phycologist by her profession. She was the first girl from Pakistan who was directly chosen for beauty pageants from the soil of Pakistan.

Beauty pageants

Miss Pakistan World
Chaudhary won the title of Miss Pakistan World in August 2020, She was the first girl who got the crown from the soil of Pakistan,

Miss Earth 2020
Chaudhary also entered as the finalists in world's third largest international beauty pageant Miss Earth 2020 which took place virtually due to pandemic. Even though Chaudhary did not place at the Miss Earth competition, she was noted as the first girl to participate in an international pageant from the soil of Pakistan.

Miss Eco International 2022
In the year 2022, Areej Chaudhary represented Pakistan in the Miss Eco International 2022 competition that is being held in Egypt. She is the third Pakistani contestant to represent Pakistan in the Miss Eco pageant. Chaudhary did not place in the top 20 in the Miss Eco International pageant and the winner was from Philippines.

Miss Global 2022
Areej took part in her fourth pageant and third international pageant in Miss Global 2022 which took place at Bali Nusa Dua International Convention Center in Bali, Indonesia.

Acting Career

Pakistan Industry

Chaudhary joined the Pakistani drama industry while she was studying in Comsats University, Lahore and known as veli girl. She has worked in dramas like Sitam aired on HUM TV where she played a negative role, She was also seen in the drama Sirat-e-Mustaqeem on ARY Digital and Oey Moti on Express Entertainment. Her first drama was Maahi on LTN family channel where she was a lead character in which she projected a positive character. She completed her first film called Dhai Chaal in March 2022.

Television

Filmography

Discography

References

External links
Miss Pakistan World Miss Pakistan World 
 Miss Pakistan World Facebook Page
 IMDB DATABASE

1997 births
Living people
Pakistani beauty pageant winners
Pakistani female models
Pakistani television actresses
Pakistani phycologists
Pakistani women
Miss Earth 2020 contestants